Thomas Chazhikadan (born 25 September 1952) is an Indian politician and Chartered Accountant and the current elected Member of Parliament from Kottayam Lok Sabha constituency and a former MLA of Kerala for Ettumanoor constituency from 1991 to 2011. He successfully contested as UDF candidate from Kottayam for Lok Sabha election in 2019. He is a member of the Kerala Congress (M).

He was the elder brother of politician Babu Chazhikadan, who was the original candidate from Ettumanoor, but killed by a lightning strike during the election campaign of 1991.

He completed his articleship training from RGN Price & Co. Chartered Accountants. He is now a partner of Thomas Chazhikadan & Associates, a Chartered Accountant firm in Kottayam, Kerala.

Early life
Thomas Chazhikadan was born on 25 September 1952 at Veliyannoor, Kottayam to Cyriac and Aleyamma Chazhikadan. He was a member of several social service clubs such as YMCA; Y's Mens Club and Lions Club International. He has served as the President of the Kottayam District Co-operative Society and the Vice-President of the New Bank of India Officers Association. He had also been the Secretary of the Bankers Club, Kottayam and a member of the M.G. University Senate.

References

External links
Official site

Malayali politicians
Living people
Kerala Congress (M) politicians
Indian accountants
Politicians from Kottayam
Kerala MLAs 1991–1996
India MPs 2019–present
1952 births